Allendale is a neighborhood of Fremont in Alameda County, California. It was formerly an unincorporated community. It lies at an elevation of 154 feet (47 m).

Neighborhoods in Fremont, California